Koprivnica is a city in northern Croatia.

Koprivnica may also refer to:

Koprivnica (Kakanj), a village in Kakanj, Bosnia and Herzegovina
Koprivnica (Aleksinac), a village in Aleksinac, Serbia
Koprivnica (Gadžin Han), a village in Gadžin Han, Serbia
Koprivnica (Zaječar), a village in Zaječar, Serbia
Koprivnica, Bardejov District, a settlement in Bardejov, Slovakia
Koprivnica, Slovenia, a settlement in Krško, Slovenia

See also
Koprzywna, Koprzywnica - Polish form
Kopřivnice - Czech form
Koprivshtitsa - Bulgarian form
Koprivnik (disambiguation)
Kopriva (disambiguation)